Fyodor Mikhaylovich Pervushin (born 21 January 1994) is a Russian football player. He plays for FC Dynamo Vladivostok.

Club career
He made his debut in the Russian Second Division for  FC Dynamo Barnaul on 2 May 2012 in a game against FC Amur-2010 Blagoveshchensk.

He made his Russian Football National League debut for FC Shinnik Yaroslavl on 17 July 2018 in a game against FC Avangard Kursk.

References

External links

1994 births
Sportspeople from Barnaul
Living people
Russian footballers
Association football defenders
FC Dynamo Barnaul players
FC Sakhalin Yuzhno-Sakhalinsk players
FC Shinnik Yaroslavl players
FC Fakel Voronezh players
FC Neftekhimik Nizhnekamsk players
FC Rotor Volgograd players
Russian First League players
Russian Second League players